Mud season (US English) or breakup (Canadian English) is a period in late winter and early spring when travel over ice is no longer safe and travel overland is more difficult as frozen earth thaws and soil becomes muddy from melting snow.

Breakup originally referred to the "breaking up" of river and lake ice. This is an eagerly anticipated event in many regions of Canada, because it marks when different modes of transportation can be used.  Vehicles from dogsleds to snowmobiles and even tractor trailers can safely traverse ice roads in the winter and aircraft with skis for landing gear can land on ice in winter, but not near breakup.  By contrast after breakup, various boats can once again use the water.

The exact date this occurs varies across the North, and corresponds to different seasons in the indigenous calendars of different regions.  In the Cree and Ojibwe calendars, one of the six seasons is called minoskamin (Woods Cree: , mithoskamin; Atikamekw: miroskamin, etc.)  which is usually translated as "breakup".  For the Woods Cree of Northern Saskatchewan this occurred in roughly May and June on the English calendar before the effects of recent climate change.  By contrast the New England mud season of (or "unlocking" as Kurt Vonnegut called it) is in March and April.

Famously, the exact date of the breakup on the Yukon River in Dawson City has been the subject of gambling since the Klondike Gold Rush, providing climate researchers with a rare unbroken record of climate data in such a remote region.

The sense of "breakup" was later expanded to the time of the year when the frozen soil that can support heavy vehicles softens. This is especially used in the oil patch (which is concentrated on the Great Plains and western portions of the boreal forest of Canada (i.e. the Western Canadian Sedimentary Basin) when well drilling activity halts and work camps "break up" for the spring.

Mud season occurs in places where the ground freezes in winter and thaws in spring. Dirt roads and paths become muddy because the deeply frozen ground thaws from the surface down as the air temperature warms above freezing. The frozen lower layers of ground prevent water from percolating into the soil so the surface layers of soil become saturated with water.

Clay-based soil, especially when combined with poor drainage, is especially prone to forming deep and sticky mud. In sandy soils, the top unfrozen layer becomes waterlogged during thaws, but does not form viscous mud.  On the Great Plains where, there is a particular type of clay bentonite clay or aluminum phyllosilicate that turns into a sticky mess called gumbo during snowmelt and spring rains.

Around the world
The term mud season is used in northern climates in North America, particularly in rural northern New England and the northern areas of the Great Lakes. It is often jokingly called the "fifth season". While significantly muddy conditions also occur throughout the Appalachians and in other mountainous regions, they are not as tightly tied to season.

A similar concept, under the name of rasputitsa in Russia or bezdorizhzhia in Ukraine, appears in Eastern European regions dominated by clay-based soils.

Consequences
Mud season can be expensive for towns due to the damage done to dirt roads.

Transportation problems during mud season have military implications, due to the bogging down of horses and military equipment in deep mud. Both Napoleon's invasion of the Russian Empire, and the German Battle of Moscow in the Soviet Union during World War II were unsuccessful in part because of the muddy environment during this season. The Mongols did manage to conquer Moscow during the 13th-century Mongol invasion, but may have been deterred from Novgorod due to the muddy bog produced by an early spring thaw. 

In the 2022 invasion of Ukraine, Russian forces' movements have been largely restricted to roads and often bogged down when leaving them.

Cultural references 
In Maine, Vermont, upstate New York, and New Hampshire, the phrase "mud season" can be used as a shorthand reference to the vicissitudes and peculiarities of life in the region. The term has been used as the title of magazines, books, and at least one movie.

References

New England
Vermont culture
New Hampshire culture
Maine culture